Hinduism in Mexico is a minority religion. There were about 12,601 (0.01%) Hindus in Mexico as of 2020.

Hindu Population & Demographics

Status of Hindus in Mexico
The Hindus in the country are mainly businessmen or professionals. Many of them work with one or the other international organisation or a multinational corporation. There are also some academicians and scientists among them. They have helped to bring about a greater mutual understanding between India and their host country.

Most members of the diaspora speak Spanish and have adapted themselves admirably to their foreign environment.

Temples in Mexico
A Sai Baba temple and a Vaishnav temple have been constructed in Mexico City by the Sangam Organisation.

Hare Krishnas
ISKCON has 8 centres in Mexico. 

 Centre 1- Guadalajara, Pedro Moreno No. 1791, Sector Juarez, Jalisco.
 Centre 2- Mexico City, Tiburcio Montiel 45, Colonia San Miguel Chapultepec, D.F, 11850.
 Centre 3- Monterrey, Av. Luis Elizondo No. 400, local 12, Col. Alta Vista.
 Centre 4- Saltillo, Blvd. Saltillo No. 520, Col. Buenos Aires.
 Centre 5- Tulancingo, (mail:) Apartado 252, Hildago.
 Centre 7- Rural Community at Veracruz.
 Centre 8- Additional Restaurant at Veracruz, Restaurante Radhe, Sur 5 No. 50, Orizaba, Ver.

Sai Organisation

There are now 29 Sai centers in Mexico.

There are two Sai Schools in Mexico, one in Chihuahua and other in Cuernavaca. There are about 100 children in each school.

See also
 Hinduism in South America
 Hinduism by country
 Encyclopedia of Hinduism
 Hindu eschatology

References

External links

 Indian Diaspora in South America